Stiritz is an unincorporated community in Williamson County, Illinois, United States.
The City is named after an prominent bussinesmen from Albert C. Stiritz, he leased the area near the City Stiritz and opended in 1902 a mine.

References

Unincorporated communities in Williamson County, Illinois
Unincorporated communities in Illinois